Jubal A. Early House, also known as the Jubal A. Early Homeplace and Archeological Site, is a historic home and archaeological site located near Boones Mill, Franklin County, Virginia.  The original dwelling was built in the first decade of the 19th century, and enlarged after 1847.  It is a two-story, four bay, frame dwelling with a side gable roof.  It has a rear ell and takes a "T" shape.  It was the childhood home of Confederate General Jubal Early (1816-1894), whose father Joab managed a tobacco plantation of more than 4,000 acres. The property was sold by the Early family in 1847. The Jubal A. Early Preservation Trust has owned the property since 1995.

It was listed on the National Register of Historic Places in 1997.

References

Houses on the National Register of Historic Places in Virginia
Archaeological sites on the National Register of Historic Places in Virginia
Houses completed in 1816
Houses in Franklin County, Virginia
National Register of Historic Places in Franklin County, Virginia
1816 establishments in Virginia
Jubal A. Early